This is a list of ships built by the Framnæs Mekaniske Værksted in Sandefjord, Norway.

Rødsverven, Søren Lorentz Christensen

Rødsverven, Lars Engebretsen

Rødsverven (Framnæs), Christen Christensen

Framnæs mek Værksted

Notes to the table:
 NHP = Nominal horse power
 LPG = Liquid Petroleum Gas

Sources
Lardex - ships built 1
Lardex - ships built 2
Lardex - Ships built complete (Norwegian)

Whaling in Norway
Whaling ships
Ships built in Sandefjord